In mathematics, the Parry–Daniels map is a function studied in the context of dynamical systems. Typical questions concern the existence of an invariant or ergodic measure for the map.

It is named after the English mathematician Bill Parry and the British statistician Henry Daniels, who independently studied the map in papers published in 1962.

Definition
Given an integer n ≥ 1, let Σ denote the n-dimensional simplex in Rn+1 given by

Let π be a permutation such that

Then the Parry–Daniels map

 

is defined by

References

Dynamical systems